Volume Two, Volume 2, Volume II or Vol. II may refer to:
 Vol. 2... Hard Knock Life, a 1998 album by rapper Jay-Z
 Volume 2 (Herb Alpert's Tijuana Brass album), 1963
 Vol. 2 (Breaking Through), by The West Coast Pop Art Experimental Band
 Volume Two (The Soft Machine album), 1969
 Volume Two (She & Him album), 2010
 Volume Two (EP), a 1991 EP by Sleep
 Volume 2 (CKY album), 1999
 Volume 2 (Chuck Berry album)
 Volume 2 (Billy Bragg album), 2006
 Volume 2 (Reagan Youth album)
 Volume 2 (The Gordons album), 1984
 Volume 2 (video), a 1999 video by Incubus
 Volume 2: Release, a 1999 album by Afro Celt Sound System
 Vol. II (Hurt album), 2007
 Vol. II (Cartel de Santa album)
 Vol.2 (Goo Goo Dolls album), 2008
 Volume II (Kamchatka album)
 Joan Baez, Vol. 2
 Miles Davis Volume 2
 Guardians of the Galaxy Vol. 2, a 2017 sequel to its 2014 predecessor.
 Volume Two, a 1991 album released by Volume (magazine)
 Volume II (September Mourning album), a 2016 album by heavy metal band September Mourning
 Vol. II: 1990 – A New Decade, a 1990 album by Soul II Soul
Volume 2 (The Bouncing Souls Album), a 2020 album by The Bouncing Souls